Sorbus discolor is a species of flowering plant in the family Rosaceae, native to China. Although it is recorded in wide use as an ornamental tree in the United Kingdom and other countries, it is not; "Sorbus discolor" is a name erroneously applied to Sorbus commixta, the Japanese rowan. Sorbus commixta fruit are bright orange to red, whereas Sorbus discolor fruit are white, or possibly dull pink to yellowish-orange.

References

discolor
Endemic flora of China
Flora of Inner Mongolia
Flora of North-Central China
Flora of Southeast China
Plants described in 1873